Bogdan Florian Barbu (born 13 April 1992) is a Romanian professional footballer who plays as a midfielder for CS Tunari.

Club career

Sportul Studențesc
Barbu he started his career playing for the club in his hometown Sportul Studențesc.He made his senior debut in a game in which he came on from the bench in the 66th minute replacing Leonard Dobre, game which his team won 2–0 against Farul Constanța in Liga II on 1 September 2012.

Loan to Voluntari
On 9 July 2014, Barbu joined Liga II side Voluntari on loan for one season.

Universitatea Cluj
On 13 January 2020, Barbu joined Liga II side Universitatea Cluj.

Honours
Fortuna Poiana Câmpina
Liga III: 2013–14

FC Voluntari
Liga II: 2014–15

References

External links
 
 Bogdan Barbu at lpf.ro

1992 births
Living people
Footballers from Bucharest
Romanian footballers
Association football midfielders
Liga I players
Liga II players
Liga III players
FC Sportul Studențesc București players
FC Voluntari players
LPS HD Clinceni players
FC Universitatea Cluj players